Coccidiphila stegodyphobius is a moth in the  family Cosmopterigidae. It was described by Walsingham in 1903. It is found in South Africa.

The larvae have been recorded feeding on decaying animal matter in the web of social spiders of the genus Stegodyphus. Pupation takes place in the spiders web. Adults do not get caught in the silk of the web.

References

Natural History Museum Lepidoptera generic names catalog

Endemic moths of South Africa
Moths described in 1903
Cosmopteriginae